Fundamental is the thirteenth studio album by Bonnie Raitt, released on April 7, 1998, by Capitol Records.

Track listing
"The Fundamental Things" (David Batteau, John Cody, Lawrence Klein) – 3:45
"Cure for Love" (David Hidalgo, Louie Pérez) – 4:11
"Round & Round" (Willie Dixon, J. B. Lenoir) – 3:16
"Spit of Love" (Raitt) – 4:44
"Lover's Will" (John Hiatt) – 4:30
"Blue for No Reason" (Paul Brady, Raitt) – 4:13
"Meet Me Half Way" (Beth Nielsen Chapman, Raitt, Annie Roboff) – 4:16
"I'm on Your Side" (Raitt) – 3:44
"Fearless Love" (Dillon O'Brian) – 4:06
"I Need Love" (Joey Spampinato) – 2:41
"One Belief Away" (Paul Brady, Dillon O'Brian, Raitt) – 4:37

Personnel 
 Bonnie Raitt – lead vocals, slide guitar, horn arrangements (1, 5, 11), keyboards (4, 8), acoustic guitar (8)
 Mitchell Froom – keyboards (1-5, 7-11), Moog bass (4), additional keyboards (6), accordion (9)
 David Hidalgo – guitar, bass (1, 2, 6-9), backing vocals (2)
 Steve Donnelly – rhythm guitar, backing vocals (3)
 Joey Spampinato – bass (3, 10), backing vocals (3, 10)
 Pete Thomas – drums, percussion
with:
 Scott Thurston – keyboards (5)
 Terry Adams – keyboards (10), backing vocals (10)
 James "Hutch" Hutchinson – bass (5, 11)
 Tony Braunagel – tambourine (5)
 Marty Grebb – tenor saxophone (1), baritone saxophone (5)
 Jimmy Roberts – saxophone (5)
 Joe Sublett – tenor saxophone (11)
 Nick Lane – trombone (5), euphonium (5)
 Darrell Leonard – trumpet (1, 11)
 Rick Braun – trumpet (5)
 Sir Harry Bowens – backing vocals (1)
 Terence Forsythe – backing vocals (1)
 Renée Geyer – backing vocals (4)
 Dillon O'Brian – backing vocals (9)
 Mark Shark – harmony vocals (11)
 Jeff Young – harmony vocals (11)

Production 
 Producers – Bonnie Raitt, Tchad Blake and Mitchell Froom.
 Recorded and Mixed by Tchad Blake 
 Home Studio Engineer – Tom Corwin
 Assistant Engineer – S. Husky Höskulds
 Mastered by Bob Ludwig at Gateway Mastering (Portland, ME).
 Art Direction and Design – Norman Moore
 Photography – Dana Tynan
 Make-up – Robin Fredriksz
 Stylist – Kate Lindsay
 Tour Oversight – Tim Bennett
 Management – Jeffrey Hersh, Ron Stone and Renata Kanclerz.

Charts
Album - Billboard (United States)

Singles - Billboard (United States)

References

Bonnie Raitt albums
1998 albums
Albums produced by Mitchell Froom
Albums produced by Tchad Blake
Capitol Records albums